Z Vlašimi is a Czech noble family in the Kingdom of Bohemia. Its members were knights and nobles, with history going back to the end of the 13th Century. It divided into family lines: Vlašimskou, Jankovskou, Jenšteinskou, Nemyčevsi and Úsovskou.

Coat of arms 

The family coat of arms features the sable eagle of house of Vlastislaviců on a shield and, in the middle of 14th century, two gules vulture heads on silver shield. In 1615, the two were combined into the coat of arms of Jankovský z Vlašimi.

See also
 Jan Očko z Vlašime
 Z Jenštejna
 Jankovský of Vlašim

References

Bohemian noble families